Grabówko may refer to the following places:
Grabówko, Kuyavian-Pomeranian Voivodeship (north-central Poland)
Grabówko, Masovian Voivodeship (east-central Poland)
Grabówko, Kościerzyna County in Pomeranian Voivodeship (north Poland)
Grabówko, Kwidzyn County in Pomeranian Voivodeship (north Poland)
Grabówko, Słupsk County in Pomeranian Voivodeship (north Poland)
Grabówko, Warmian-Masurian Voivodeship (north Poland)
Grabówko, West Pomeranian Voivodeship (north-west Poland)